The Crazy Clinic is a 1954 West German comedy film directed by Alwin Elling and starring Ingrid Andree, Maria Andergast and Claus Biederstaedt. It was shot at the Göttingen Studios with sets designed by the art directors Heinrich Richter and Bruno Lutz .

Cast
 Ingrid Andree as Inge
 Maria Andergast as Gutsbesitzerin
 Claus Biederstaedt as Evelyns Begleiter
 Joachim Brennecke as Inges Begleiter
 Charlott Daudert as Lissy
 Erich Fiedler as Henry
 Albert Florath
 Ursula Grabley
 Al Hoosmann
 Martl Koch
 Harald Paulsen as Professor
 Mady Rahl as Wera
 Lotte Rausch
 Willi Sahler
 Franz Schafheitlin
 Jeanette Schultze as Evelyn
 Josef Sieber
 Hans Zesch-Ballot

References

Bibliography
 Parish, James Robert. Film Actors Guide. Scarecrow Press, 1977.

External links 
 

1954 films
1954 comedy films
German comedy films
West German films
1950s German-language films
German black-and-white films
1950s German films
Films directed by Alwin Elling
Films shot at Göttingen Studios